Isocoma coronopifolia, the common goldenbush, is a North American plant species in the family Asteraceae. It has been found on both sides of the Río Grande, in Tamaulipas, Coahuila, Nuevo León, Chihuahua, and southern Texas.

Isocoma coronopifolia is a shrub up to 120 cm (4 feet) tall. The plant produces flower heads in clusters on the tips of branches, each head containing 12-15 disc flowers but no ray flowers.

References

coronopifolia
Flora of Coahuila
Flora of Nuevo León
Flora of Tamaulipas
Flora of Texas
Plants described in 1852
Taxa named by Asa Gray
Taxa named by Edward Lee Greene